Leotropa phoenicias is a species of snout moth. It was described by George Hampson in 1918. It is found in Sierra Leone.

References

Moths described in 1918
Anerastiini